Alessandra Stanley (born October 3, 1955 in Boston, Massachusetts) is an American journalist. As of 2019, she is the co-founder of a weekly newsletter "for worldly cosmopolitans" called Air Mail, alongside former Vanity Fair editor-in-chief Graydon Carter.

Biography
She was born in Boston, Massachusetts, and grew up in Washington, D.C., and Europe. She is the daughter of NATO defense advisor Timothy W. Stanley.  She studied literature at Harvard University and then became a correspondent for Time, working overseas as well as in Los Angeles and in Washington, D.C., where she covered the White House.  Stanley then moved to The New York Times as a foreign correspondent, first as co-chief of their Moscow bureau, and then Rome bureau chief.  In 2003 she became the chief television critic for The New York Times.  She has also written for The New York Times Magazine, The New Republic, GQ and Vogue.

In 1993, Alessandra Stanley received The Matrix Award from Women in Communications, and in 1998, she received the Weintal Prize for Diplomatic Reporting.

Among Stanley's notable columns are her critical take on the series finale of The Sopranos, her assessment of Jerry Sandusky's denial of charges of pedophilia to NBC and her coverage of Russian television on the eve of the 2012 Russian presidential election.

In the fall of 2011, Stanley taught a class at Princeton University called "Investigative Viewing: The Art of Television Criticism", described as an "intensive introduction to criticism as it is undertaken at the highest level of a cultural institution".

Several news and media organizations, including the Times, have criticized the accuracy of Stanley's reporting. Among the articles that they have criticized are a September 5, 2005, piece on Hurricane Katrina, a 2005 article that mistakenly called the sitcom Everybody Loves Raymond "All About Raymond," and a July 18, 2009, retrospective on the career of Walter Cronkite that contained errors. In an August 2009 article examining the mistakes in the Cronkite piece, Clark Hoyt, the Timess public editor, described Stanley as "much admired by editors for the intellectual heft of her coverage of television" but "with a history of errors". Then executive editor Bill Keller defended Stanley, saying "She is — in my opinion, among others — a brilliant critic".

Stanley, who is Euro-American, wrote an article for The New York Times in September 2014 entitled "Wrought in Rhimes's Image: Viola Davis Plays Shonda Rhimes's Latest Tough Heroine" about television series How to Get Away with Murder and the career of its African-American producer, Shonda Rhimes. Stanley wrote, "When Shonda Rhimes writes her autobiography, it should be called 'How to Get Away With Being an Angry Black Woman and made comments about African-Americans that were seen as offensive. Stanley's piece, wrote the Times'''s Public Editor, Margaret Sullivan, "struck many readers as completely off-base. Many called it offensive, while some went further, saying it was racist".  Stanley defended her piece, writing in an email message to Talking Points Memo, "[t]he whole point of the piece—once you read past the first 140 characters—is to praise Shonda Rhimes for pushing back so successfully on a tiresome but insidious stereotype". The organization Color of Change called for a retraction from the Times.

As of 2017, Stanley is no longer employed by the Times.

In 2023, Stanley co-authored a letter from the editor for Air Mail Weekly explaining their decision to let accused rapist Armie Hammer tell his side of the story in response to charges filed against him in 2022. In the letter, Stanley cites their decision was made in an attempt to "believe the men."

Personal life
Stanley was previously married to Michael Specter. She is friends with New York Times'' columnist Maureen Dowd.

References

Living people
Harvard University alumni
The New York Times writers
Critics employed by The New York Times
Time (magazine) people
Place of birth missing (living people)
American women journalists
American women critics
1955 births
21st-century American women